Numan al-Samarrai (1935 – 25 November 2021) was an Iraqi Sunni Muslim scholar and politician. A member of the Iraqi Islamic Party, he served as its first-ever Secretary-General in 1960 prior to the party's banning.

References

1935 births
2021 deaths
Iraqi politicians
Iraqi Islamic Party politicians
People from Samarra